Gabriele Raine Abellana Baljak (born 1996) is a Filipino-Australian former beauty queen. She was Miss Cebu 2016, and is a public speaker, health and fitness coach, model and researcher.

Early life 
Baljak was born in Sydney, Australia, and moved to Cebu City, Philippines as a child.

She attended Cebu International School and is currently attending the University of South Australia.

Miss Cebu 2016 
On the first night she was awarded two of the four awards given, Miss Epson for her knowledge of Cebuano history and Best in Funwear in her two-piece creation by Mike Yapching. On the final evening she was named  as ABS-CBN's Kapamilya Star of the Night and Best in Evening Gown wearing designer Dino Lloren.

References 

Filipino beauty pageant winners
1996 births
Filipino female models
Australian female models
Models from Sydney
Living people
Filipino health activists
Cebuano beauty pageant winners